is a vertically scrolling shooter released in arcades by Konami in December 1987. There was a European release of the game called Typhoon, which is the name used for Imagine Software's ZX Spectrum, Amstrad CPC, and Commodore 64 ports.

The players control a "Tom Tiger" helicopter (in the 2D stage) and later a "Jerry Mouse" fighter jet (in the 3D stage), and shoot enemies in the air and bomb them on the ground, collecting power-ups and defeating bosses to advance levels.

Gameplay
The game takes place in a fictional 2007 where the Earth has been conquered by alien invaders. The player combats the occupation forces using vehicles under operation code named 'A-Jax' created to liberate the Earth. Game play is divided into two scrolling sections with two different vehicles: the first being a vertical scrolling section with the helicopter and a Rail scrolling stage with the jet/space fighter. The game spans eight stages and extends to 30,000 points, a second at 150,000 points.

During the helicopter segments, the player has access to four different weapons including the Vulcan, Bomb, 3-Way, Triple and Laser. Each weapon is available through their own specific pick-up icon. However, the helicopter can only equip one firing weapon at a time with the Bomb being constant. The player also has access to Options which add additional firepower. The jet segments contrast highly from the helicopter segments, they have a complete lack of available power-ups and additional weapons beyond a machine gun and bomb.

Reception 
In Japan, Game Machine listed A-Jax on their January 15, 1988 issue as being the second most-successful table arcade unit of the year.

References

External links

Ajax Arcade Archives Page

1987 video games
Amstrad CPC games
Arcade video games
Commodore 64 games
DOS games
Helicopter video games
Konami games
Vertically scrolling shooters
ZX Spectrum games
X68000 games
Nintendo Switch games
PlayStation 4 games
PlayStation Network games
Konami arcade games
Video games developed in Japan

es:Typhoon (videojuego)
Hamster Corporation games